Acero (born 1984) is a Mexican .

Acero may also refer to:

People 
 Amós Acero (1893–1941), Spanish politician
 Esthela Acero (born 1984), Ecuadorian politician
 Nestor Acero (died 1972), Philippine Medal of Valor recipient
 Vicente Acero (1675/1680–1739), Spanish architect

Other uses 
 CD Acero, a Spanish football team
 Monte Acero, a mountain in Italy